Special Jury Prize may refer to:

 Special Jury Prize (Karlovy Vary IFF)
 Special Jury Prize (Locarno International Film Festival)
 Special Jury Prize (Sarajevo Film Festival)
 Special Jury Prize (Venice Film Festival)
 Jury Prize (Cannes Film Festival), previously the Special Jury Prize